Lophomyrmex quadrispinosus is a species of ant in the subfamily Formicinae. It is found in India, Sri Lanka, China, and Israel.

References

External links
 at antwiki.org
Itis.gov
Animaldiversity.org

Myrmicinae
Hymenoptera of Asia
Insects described in 1851